Walter Freer (born 1846) was a Scottish Liberal Party worker. He was the son of a notable Chartist and has been described as a "staunch Gladstonian". He was also a power-loom tenter and temperance worker.

Notes

Further reading
Walter Freer, My Life and Memories (Glasgow: Civic Press, 1929).

1846 births
Year of death missing
Chartists
Scottish Liberal Party politicians
Scottish temperance activists